Gwangmyeongsageori Station is a station on Line 7 of the Seoul Subway, even though the station itself is located in the heart of the neighboring city of Gwangmyeong. Its name was changed from Gwangmyeong Station when the KTX Gwangmyeong Station was opened in 2004.

Station layout

Vicinity
Exit 3 : Gwangmyeongnam Elementary School
Exit 4 : Hanjin Town APT
Exit 5 : Gwangmyeongseo Elementary School
Exit 6 : Kaemyong Elementary School
Exit 8 : Gwangmyeong Elementary School
Exit 9 : Gwangmyeong CGV

Metro stations in Gwangmyeong
Seoul Metropolitan Subway stations
Railway stations opened in 2000